The 1998 Huntingdonshire District Council election took place on 7 May 1998 to elect members of Huntingdonshire District Council in Cambridgeshire, England. One third of the council was up for election and the Conservative Party stayed in overall control of the council.

After the election, the composition of the council was:
Conservative 34
Liberal Democrats 14
Labour 3
Independent 2

Election result

Ward results

By-elections between 1998 and 1999

References

1998 English local elections
1998
20th century in Cambridgeshire